Jabal Sha'ir is a mountain in Hama Governorate in Syria. It has an elevation of 1,215 meters and ranks as the second highest mountain in the Hama Governorate and the 186th highest in Syria.

See also

List of mountains of Syria

References 

Mountains of Hama Governorate